Sidraž is a settlement in the Municipality of Cerklje na Gorenjskem in the Upper Carniola region of Slovenia.

Geography
Sidraž is a hill settlement in a shady location east of Šenturška Gora on a saddle between Doblič and Tunjščica creeks. The soil is loamy and there is a spring near the village.

Name
Sidraž was mentioned in historical sources in 1421 as Schydrachs (and as Sidras in 1449, Sydrasch in 1458, and Schidrass in 1475). The name is of unclear origin. A proposed derivation from *suhi draž is very unlikely for phonological reasons, and the village name is more likely based on a truncated personal name.

References

External links

Sidraž on Geopedia

Populated places in the Municipality of Cerklje na Gorenjskem